Tooreen Hurling Club is a Gaelic Athletic Association club based in the village of Tooreen, County Mayo, Ireland.

Tooreen is located in the parish of Aghamore approximately four miles (6.4 km) from the town of Ballyhaunis in eastern County Mayo which is the county's hurling stronghold.

Players are drawn from the Tooreen area as well as from the Aghamore, Ballyhaunis, Kilkelly and Knock areas. The club is affiliated as an Exclusive Hurling Club to the Mayo County Board.

History
The club was formed in 1957 and celebrated its 50th Anniversary in 2007.

The club won its first Mayo Senior Hurling Championship Title in 1966 and is the holder of 30 county senior titles and is the current (2019) champion.

In 2017, the club became the first Mayo team, and the first from outside Galway, to win the Connacht Intermediate Hurling final. They were four point winners over Ballinderreen of Galway in Athleague, winning by 1 -14 to 1- 11.

The club has many dual players who play for the neighbouring Gaelic football club in Aghamore.

Tooreen Hurling Club also has an underage section with teams from U6 to U18. The club colours are blue and white.

References

External links
https://web.archive.org/web/20080509124008/http://www.tooreenhurlers.com/
https://web.archive.org/web/20070206211901/http://archives.tcm.ie/westernpeople/2006/03/08/story29757.asp
http://www.westernpeople.ie/news/story/?trs=mhsnsnauoj&cat=sport
http://www.mayonews.ie/index.php?option=com_content&task=view&id=2188&Itemid=94
http://www.sportsmanager.ie/t3.php?userid=616&countyid=39&club_id=&clubid=&sportid=1&returntoarchive=1&newsstory=575
http://www.mayo-ireland.ie/ConnTel/CT9807/CT980715/GAA1.htm
http://ulster.gaa.ie/2008/03/

Hurling clubs in County Mayo
Gaelic games clubs in County Mayo